Fluentd is a cross-platform open-source data collection software project originally developed at Treasure Data. It is written primarily in the Ruby programming language.

Overview 
Fluentd was positioned for "big data", semi- or un-structured data sets. It analyzes event logs, application logs, and clickstreams. According to Suonsyrjä and Mikkonen, the "core idea of Fluentd is to be the unifying layer between different types of log inputs and outputs.", Fluentd is available on Linux, macOS, and Windows.

History 
Fluentd was created by Sadayuki Furuhashi as a project of the Mountain View-based firm Treasure Data. Written primarily in Ruby, its source code was released as open-source software in October 2011.
The company announced $5 million of funding in 2013.
Treasure Data was then sold to Arm Ltd. in 2018.

Users 

Fluentd was one of the data collection tools recommended by Amazon Web Services in 2013, when it was said to be similar to Apache Flume or Scribe. Google Cloud Platform's BigQuery recommends Fluentd as the default real-time data-ingestion tool, and uses Google's customized version of Fluentd, called google-fluentd, as a default logging agent.

Fluent Bit 
Fluent Bit is a log processor and log forwarder which is being developed as a CNCF sub-project under the umbrella of Fluentd project. Fluentd is written in C and Ruby and built as a Ruby gem so it consumes some amount of memory resources. On the other hand, since Fluent Bit is written only in C and has no dependencies, the consumed memory usage much decreased compared to Fluentd which makes it easy to run on the embedded Linux and container environment.

References

Further reading
Goasguen, Sébastien (2014). 60 Recipes for Apache CloudStack: Using the CloudStack Ecosystem, "Chapter 6: Advanced Recipes". O'Reilly Media. 
Wilkins, Phil (2022). Logging in Action, With Fluentd, Kubernetes and more. Manning.

External links
 
 Source Code on GitHub

Big data companies
Data warehousing products
Data security
Computer security companies
Free software
Free software programmed in Ruby
System administration
Data mining and machine learning software
Free science software
Free data analysis software
Free artificial intelligence applications
Computer logging